The 1980–81 St. Francis Terriers men's basketball team represented St. Francis College during the 1980–81 NCAA Division I men's basketball season. The team was coached by Gene Roberti, who was in his second year at the helm of the St. Francis Terriers. The Terriers played their homes games at the  Generoso Pope Athletic Complex and played an Independent, not affiliated with a conference.

The Terriers finished their season at 10–16.

Roster

Schedule and results

|-
!colspan=12 style="background:#0038A8; border: 2px solid #CE1126;;color:#FFFFFF;"| Regular Season

 

source

References

St. Francis Brooklyn Terriers men's basketball seasons
St. Francis
St. Francis Brooklyn Terriers men's basketball
St. Francis Brooklyn Terriers men's basketball